Tutin may refer to:

Places
Tutin, Serbia, town in Serbia

Surname
Arthur Tutin (1907–1961), English footballer
Dorothy Tutin (1930–2001), English actress
Mary Tutin, maiden name of Mary Gillick (1881–1965), English sculptor
Tom Tutin (1908–1987), botanist, co-author of several floras

Chemistry
Tutin (toxin), a glycine receptor antagonist found in the New Zealand tutu plant

Surnames of English origin